Ntuthuko Radebe (29 September 1994 – 4 July 2017) was a South African footballer who played as a full-back.

Club career

Early career
Born in 1994 in Johannesburg, Radebe started his youth football career at Aspire Academy. In July 2012, he moved to Belgium side K.A.S. Eupen reserve team.

K.A.S. Eupen
In 2012, Radebe was called up for K.A.S. Eupen first team. On 15 December 2012, Radebe made his senior team debut in Belgian Second Division (currently Belgian First Division B) against Dessel Sport at Armand Melis Stadion, replacing Fazlı Kocabaş at the 82nd by coach Tintín Márquez. On 26 January 2014, he scored his first senior goal against SC Eendracht Aalst in the 20th minute. Radebe played 34 games and scored one goal in Belgian Second Division from 2012 to 2015. In the 2015–16 season, Eupen ended the season as runners-up and promoted to Belgian First Division A. On 15 October 2016, he made his Belgian First Division A debut against Waasland-Beveren, playing as a starter for 82 minutes.

Death
On 4 July 2017, Radebe died in a car accident.

References

1994 births
2017 deaths
South African soccer players
South African expatriate soccer players
Association football fullbacks
K.A.S. Eupen players
Belgian Pro League players
Challenger Pro League players
South African expatriate sportspeople in Belgium
Expatriate footballers in Belgium
Soccer players from Johannesburg
Road incident deaths in South Africa
Aspire Academy (Senegal) players